Macphersonite, Pb4(SO4)(CO3)2 (OH)2, is a carbonate mineral that is trimorphous with leadhillite and susannite. Macphersonite is generally white, colorless, or a pale amber in color and has a white streak. It crystallizes in the orthorhombic system with a space group of Pcab.  It is fairly soft mineral that has a high specific gravity.

Macphersonite is named after Harry Gordon Macpherson, a keeper of minerals at the Royal Scottish Museum.  It was discovered and accepted in 1984.

Structure 
The structure of macphersonite is represented as a sequence of three layers stacked along the [001]. The first layer is a sulfate tetrahedra, the second is of lead and hydroxide, and the third is a layer composed of lead and carbonate. Stacking of the three layers can be detailed as ...BABCCBABCC... similar to leadhillite.  Two C layers of lead carbonate in the BAB stacking provide a weak connection that leads to the perfect {001} cleavage.

Physical properties 
The Leadhills macphersonite is a very pale amber to colorless in color, while the Argentolle mine macphersonite is colorless to white.  It has a luster of adamantine on fresh surfaces and elsewhere it is resinous. Macphersonite is soft with a 2.5-3 on the Mohs hardness, has an uneven fracture with a high density of 6.5g/cm3.

Macphersonite has a very strong yellow fluorescence under both long and short wave, ultraviolet is displayed by the Leadhills specimens, the Argentolle material does not fluoresce.

Occurrence 
Macphersonite is found in the Leadhills region of southwest Scotland and in the Saint-Prix, Saône-et-Loire region of France. It is the rarest of the three polymorphs. It occurs in lead deposits associated with cerussite, susannite, caledonite, scotlandite, leadhillite, galena and pyromorphite.

References

Carbonate minerals
Orthorhombic minerals
Minerals in space group 61